Zipperface is a 1992 American erotic slasher film written and directed by Mansour Pourmand, and co-written by Barbara Bishop. It stars David Clover, Donna Adams, and Jonathan Mandell.

Plot 
A sadomasochistic serial killer in a bondage suit is running amok in Palm City, murdering stage actresses who moonlight as BDSM prostitutes. Assigned to the case are Detectives Lisa Ryder and Harry Shine, who are under pressure to apprehend the culprit as soon as possible in order to appease the ruthless Mayor Angela Harris. As the duo's investigation progresses, they uncover a number of different suspects, including a misogynist fellow officer named Willy Scalia, a cross-dressing mayor's aide named Devon McClain, a charitable preacher named Reverend Dimsdale, and a professional photographer named Michael Walker.

Lisa begins dating Michael in secret, which leads to her suspension from the force when mounting circumstantial evidence points towards him being "Zipperface". After a warrant is put out for Michael's arrest, he and Lisa go to confront Reverend Dimsdale, having realized that he is in some way connected to all of Zipperface's victims, possibly acting as a pimp for the sex workers who he was supposed to be helping find God. The two discover the reverend dead from a slit throat, and question one of his prostitutes, who informs them that Dimsdale had earlier called her, begging her not to go to her appointment with a new "John".

Lisa and Michael follow the directions that the prostitute had been given to an abandoned warehouse that contains Zipperface's sex dungeon, unaware that they are being tailed by Detective Shine. Zipperface wounds Michael and attempts to strangle Lisa, but Michael recovers, saves her and stabs Zipperface with his own machete.  this incapacitates him long enough for Shine to arrive with both backup and Mayor Harris. Zipperface is unmasked to reveal that he is the mayor's husband, Brewster. After her husband rants about how feelings of emasculation drove him to dominate and eventually murder prostitutes, the distraught Mayor Harris, realizing that her political career is now over, pulls out a gun and shoots Brewster.

Cast 
 Donna Adams as Detective Lisa Ryder
 Jonathan Mandell as Michael Walker
 David Clover as Detective Harry Shine
 Trisha Melynkov as Mayor Angela Harris
 Bruce Brown as Brewster Harris
 Harold Cannon as Chief Wexford
 Timothy D. Lechner as Devon McClain
 Richard Vidan as Detective Willy Scalia
 Jillian Ross as Natalie
 Rikki Brando as Sherry Lockwood
 Kimberly Hamilton-Mansfield as Janet Manson
 Laureen E. Clair as Elizabeth
 Mike Ferraro as Alvin Russo
 Denise Ezell as Lana Baker
 Christopher Dakin as Reverend Dimsdale

Reception 
Zipperface was heavily criticized by TV Guide, which condemned it as a cross between "female exploitation and feminist-bashing" that was "low-grade in all departments, not just gender politics". The film was similarly derided by Todd Martin of Horror News, who wrote, "Not only is it unoriginal and poorly-written, it also has some of the worst acting I have seen in a very long time and is just a mighty bad movie in general in every conceivable way."

References

External links 
 

1992 films
1992 horror films
1990s erotic thriller films
1990s horror thriller films
1992 independent films
1990s mystery thriller films
1990s serial killer films
1990s slasher films
Abandoned buildings and structures in fiction
Adultery in films
American erotic thriller films
American horror thriller films
American independent films
American mystery thriller films
American police detective films
American serial killer films
American slasher films
BDSM in films
Crimes against sex workers in fiction
Cross-dressing in American films
1990s English-language films
American erotic horror films
Erotic mystery films
Erotic slasher films
American mystery horror films
Films about domestic violence
Films about prostitution in the United States
Films set in a theatre
Films set in San Diego
Films shot in Los Angeles
Mariticide in fiction
1990s American films